Weightlifting competitions at the 2021 Junior Pan American Games were held from 26 to 29 November 2021 at the Ramón Elías López Arena in Palmira, Colombia.

Medal summary

Medal table

Medalists

Men's

Women's

References

External links
Weightlifting at the 2021 Junior Pan American Games
Results

Weightlifting
Junior Pan American Games
2021 Junior Pan American Games
Qualification tournaments for the 2023 Pan American Games